The Dodds Baronetcy, of West Chiltington in the County of Sussex, is a title in the Baronetage of the United Kingdom. It was created on 10 February 1964 for Charles Dodds, President of the Royal College of Physicians from 1962 to 1966. The baronetcy became extinct on the death of his son, the second baronet, in 2015.

Dodds baronets, of West Chiltington (1964)
Sir (Edward) Charles Dodds, 1st Baronet (1899–1973)
Sir Ralph Jordan Dodds, 2nd Baronet (1928–2015)

References

Kidd, Charles, Williamson, David (editors). Debrett's Peerage and Baronetage (1990 edition). New York: St Martin's Press, 1990, 

Dodds